Sri Sri Sitaramdas Omkarnath (17 February 1892 – 6 December 1982) was an Indian spiritual master. Addressed as Sri Sri Thakur Sitaramdas Omkarnath, where "Omkar" signifies the supreme cosmic enlightenment and attaining supreme consciousnes, he was heralded as the Divine Incarnate (Avatar) of Kali Yuga and espoused the doctrines of Sanatan Dharma and Vedic spiritual path to countless devotees from across the world, with central theme and paramount importance on the beneficence of Divine Chanting Naam of Hare Krishna Hare Ram - regarded as the omnipotent "Tarak Brahma Naam" the chant of soul deliverance in Kali Yuga and "Moksha" liberation from cycle of birth and death. As such, his disciples continue to worship him as an incarnation of the Lord himself and is verily regarded as an eternal source of spiritual enlightenment and soul succour to all seekers. because his life had been predicted in a manuscript of Achyutananda Dasa.  Sitaramdas Omkarnath wrote more than 150 books to promote the essence of Indian scriptures, built more than 60 temples and ashrams all across India, and founded His spiritual organisation Akhil Bharat Jaiguru Sampradaya, established many groups, temples, mutts, both within and outside the Sampradaya— and was also the initiator of multiple magazines like Pather Alo, Devjan, JaiGuru, Arya Nari, Paramananda, and The Mother.

Birth and childhood
Sri Sri SitaRam Das Omkarnath was born at his maternal uncle's house located in remote Keota village under Hooghly district, West Bengal, at 8:01 AM on the 6th waning lunar day, of Hindu month Falgun circa 1892. English Calendar DOB 17 February 1892.  His name consecrated at birth was Prabodh Chandra Chattopadhyay, and his birth parents were Pranhari Chattopadhyay and Mallyabati Devi. Father Pranhari was a pious Brahmin and worked as a village physician in Dumurdaha, Hooghly district. A childhood incidence came to be famous about him once he attained his spiritual supremacy - once as a young child, (then Prabodh Chandra Chattopadhyay) he was listening to the mahamantra HareKrishna Nama Sankirtan, and he attained "Samadhi" (heightened spiritual communion state in altered consciousness) during the Kirtan. 
But as generally assumed by local villagers, he was thought to have fainted. However an ascetic present at the venue, told his grandmother, accompanying him that he has not fainted but attained samadhi. And if holy Ganges water is sprayed on him and lord rama's name is sung to him, he will recover from samadhi. He did resume his normal conscious state,  when done the same . The kuladevata (family deity) was Brajanath (Krishna).

In 1896, his birth mother Mallyabati Devi passed away, leaving infant Prabodh, then all of four years old, in the care of his extended family. Father Pranhari soon remarried a much younger Giribala Devi - aged barely 10–11 years at that time; who went on to dedicate her entire life till death, at the service of this family and raising her foster children as her own, esp Prabodh being the youngest. Father Pranhari later passed away in 1912.

Education 
Omkarnath attended a village school but then determined that Dasarathidev Yogeswar of Digsui village should be his guru.Though he was admitted to the Bandel Church School for a quite of time to pursue Western Education, he left that school for is earnest interest in Indian Sankritised Education system.  Thereafter he studied at Yogeswar's house, where he undertook daily chores as well as spiritual education. In 1918, Probodh was meditating at about midnight when he visualised the god Shiva along with the Durga, the Divine Mother.

Later, Omkarnath saw his previous birth on the day of Saraswati puja. Through this he came to believe that he was a famous worshipper of the goddess Kali in previous life.

Spiritual quest
Guru Dasarathidev had named him Sitaram, the name Omkarnath was a divine revelation which was later formally conferred by Swami Dhruvananda Giri. Thus, Probodh came to be known as Sitaramdas Omkarnath. He had heard the Hare Krishna MahaMantra as a Divine Sound during his austere meditation in a cave at Ramashram, Dumurdaha, Hooghly. Later, he heard a divine voice say "O Sage, dive in". Still Sitaram was not ready for giving spiritual initiation to masses, and he waited for direct command. At Puri, Orissa, Sitaram visualised Jagannath in a halo and Jagannath gave the instruction — "Go, Go, Go and give the Name". Thereafter, Sitaram started spreading the Lord's name on a mass scale.

As a preacher/guru
After getting what is believed to be the Divine instruction, Omkarnath began to preach Nam all across India. Temples were established and renovated, the poor were fed, clothes were distributed, help was given to the fathers of marriageable daughters, taking on the responsibility of lifetime maintenance of hundreds of poverty-stricken families, establishment of free schools for poor students, setting up 29 Akhanda Naam Kirtan centres across India, establishing temples and ashrams, and several other activities of the kind went on continuously. Though he was a follower of both Ramanuj and Ramanandi sect, he himself developed a unique philosophical school named "Avinava Pranab-vad"

Millions of men and women took spiritual initiation from Sitaram. His reputation spread and people gathered in large numbers wherever he resided. Sitaram was respected by contemporaries such as Anandamayi Ma, Mohanananda Brahmachari, Dalai Lama, Vilayat Inayat Khan, Swami Chidananda, Jain Muni Sushil Kumar and others. He was believed to be an incarnation of Lord Sri Ramachandra, and is one of the most spiritually powerful and sound people that ever existed in human history. He is also one of the purest people who have ever existed.

Teachings

According to Omkarnath,

Sitaramdas Omkarnath's spiritual philosophy encompassed Bhakti, Jnana, Karma Yoga, Kriya Yoga and all segments of ancient Indian religion, with emphasis on Nam [Lord's Name]. Sitaramdas did not promote conversion, but guided all seekers on the path of their respective religion. He said- 'The paths may differ, but HE is not different.' By holding onto the Holy Name of Lord, and by performing the duties prescribed by religion of oneself, everybody can attain the Supreme Truth.

The teachings of Omkarnath derive from his personal experiences, revealed in the course of a lifelong and continual spiritual practice. His teachings were compiled by Kinkar Omananda (alias Madhav Swamiji), one of his closest monastic disciples.

Miracles
Many of unexplained incidents associated with Omkarnath have been documented in books and newspapers by prominent personalities. Among these are:

The writer Nabaneeta Dev Sen wrote of a 'medical miracle' she had seen. Her father, Naren Dev, was in coma for several days but when Omkarnath came and touched him, he opened his eyes and talked and within a week had begun walking.
Many newspapers of Kolkata reported a revival from death at a Calcutta Medical College. Padmalochan Mukerjee was declared dead, Omkarnath arrived, touched him and revived him in front of Sister G. Wood, who was overwhelmed by the incident.
General Sujan Singh Uban described that Omkarnath had foreseen the Indo-Pakistan war of December 1971 and that during the war a supernatural power of Omkarnath had given him an extraordinary victory. Besides the national issues, Uban had felt the powers of Omkarnath in many aspects of his personal life.

Death
Sri Sri SitaRam Das Onkarnat attained "Mahasamadhi" in the early hours of 6 December 1982. His mortal "SriVigraha" was placed at his first established ashram Sri Ramashram, Dumurdaha, so that people could pay their last respects. His holy mortal frame was consigned to flames on a sandalwood pyre on 8 December 1982.

References

Works cited
 Books
 
  
  
 
 Journals

Further reading

External links
 Akhil Bharat JaiGuru Sampraday
 Omkarnathdev
 Pather Alo
 Mother

1892 births
1982 deaths
20th-century Hindu religious leaders
Bengali Hindu saints
Hindu mystics
Indian Hindu monks
Indian Hindu saints
Indian Hindu spiritual teachers
People from West Bengal
People from Hooghly district